Paulo Oliveira de Souza Júnior (born 5 May 1988 in Belém), known as Paulinho, is a Brazilian footballer who plays for Brasil de Pelotas on loan from Marcílio Dias as left back.

Career statistics

Honours
Londrina
Campeonato Paranaense: 2014

CSA
Campeonato Alagoano: 2018

References

External links

1988 births
Living people
Sportspeople from Belém
Brazilian footballers
Association football defenders
Campeonato Brasileiro Série A players
Campeonato Brasileiro Série B players
Campeonato Brasileiro Série C players
Campeonato Brasileiro Série D players
Tuna Luso Brasileira players
Esporte Clube Juventude players
Murici Futebol Clube players
Centro Sportivo Alagoano players
Associação Atlética Coruripe players
Botafogo Futebol Clube (SP) players
Clube do Remo players
Grêmio Barueri Futebol players
Londrina Esporte Clube players
Paraná Clube players
Goiás Esporte Clube players
Clube Náutico Marcílio Dias players
Avaí FC players